The list of ship commissionings in 1923 includes a chronological list of all ships commissioned in 1923.



See also 

1923